Archipimima sinuocostana is a species of moth of the family Tortricidae. It is endemic to Ecuador (Morona-Santiago Province).

Etymology
The species name refers to the sinuate forewing costa.

References

External links

Moths described in 2006
Endemic fauna of Ecuador
Atteriini
Moths of South America
Taxa named by Józef Razowski